Most usage of supercluster in population genetics research articles applies to proposed large groups of human mtDNA haplotype lineages, found by cluster analysis, that are thought to stem from a single distant most recent common ancestor, on a time scale of tens of thousands of years.

Other usage
Usage of supercluster for geographically defined human populations instead of mtDNA strains is rarely seen. However, it does appear in the seminal Cavalli-Sforza paper 
 Reconstruction of human evolution: bringing together genetic, archaeological, and linguistic data. (1988) to describe "Northeurasian" and "Southeast Asian" collections of sampled populations, which are also more frequently referred to in the paper as "major cluster" or simply "cluster".
Therefore use of "supercluster" as a euphemism for "race" might be considered a neologism or, more likely, an idiosyncratic usage according to the Google test.

Usage of supercluster for populations as well as haplotypes makes the term ambiguous and may require clarification when the word is used.

External links
Examples of usage to describe haplogroups, not races:
 The sub-Saharan African mtDNAs belong largely to an mtDNA supercluster L
 More than 90% of European mtDNAs belong to nine haplogroups (Fig. 1), which are highly specific for Western Eurasia (4, 6). These clusters are all thought to originate from one supercluster, L3n (N).
 The main determinants of this PC analysis are therefore the HV supercluster members, haplogroups H, HV, and pre-HV. Actually, whereas in the European populations haplogroup H reaches its highest frequencies, HV and pre-HV mtDNAs (when present) have a very low incidence.
 We have denoted it as lineage M-I as it is obviously different from other members of M supercluster occurring in Siberia/Asia.
 A high frequency of mtDNA types belonging to Asian supercluster M was peculiar for Yakuts
 A high frequency of mtDNA types belonging to Asian supercluster M was peculiar for Yakuts

Ethnic groups
Population genetics